Dean Allen Takko (born July 9, 1950) is an American politician who served as a member of the Washington State Senate, representing the 19th district from 2015 to 2021. A member of the Democratic Party, he previously served as a member of the Washington House of Representatives from 2004 to 2015.

Career
Takko served on the Cathlament City Council from 1974-1975 after graduating from Western Washington University. He was the county assessor for Wahkiakum County from 1975-1978 and for Cowlitz County from 1999-2004.

References

1950 births
Living people
Democratic Party members of the Washington House of Representatives
21st-century American politicians
People from Ilwaco, Washington
Democratic Party Washington (state) state senators